Andriy Tkachuk (born 18 November 1987) is a professional Ukrainian football midfielder who plays for Karpaty Lviv.

External links
 
 
 

1987 births
Living people
Footballers from Zhytomyr
Ukrainian footballers
Ukrainian Premier League players
Ukrainian First League players
Ukrainian Second League players
FC Polissya Zhytomyr players
FC Karpaty Lviv players
FC Karpaty-2 Lviv players
FC Arsenal Kyiv players
FC Vorskla Poltava players
Association football midfielders
Ukrainian expatriate footballers
FC Akzhayik players
FC Atyrau players
Expatriate footballers in Kazakhstan
Ukrainian expatriate sportspeople in Kazakhstan
FC Chornomorets Odesa players
FC Mynai players
Sportspeople from Zhytomyr Oblast